Åse Gunhild Woie Duesund (born 18 April 1944, in Grimstad) is a Norwegian politician representing Aust-Agder in the Storting. She is a representative of Christian People's Party and was first elected in 1997.

Parliamentary Committee duties
2001–2005 second vice-leader of the Welfare committee.
2000–2005 reserve member of the Extended Foreign Affairs committee.
1997–2005 member of the Accreditation committee.
1997–2001 member of the Welfare committee.
1997–2000 member of the Extended Foreign Affairs committee.

External links

1944 births
Living people
Women members of the Storting
Christian Democratic Party (Norway) politicians
Members of the Storting
People from Grimstad
21st-century Norwegian politicians
21st-century Norwegian women politicians
20th-century Norwegian politicians
20th-century Norwegian women politicians